Graafland is a hamlet in the Dutch province of South Holland. It is a part of the municipality of Molenlanden, and lies about 13 km northwest of Gorinchem.

The statistical area "Graafland", which also can include the surrounding countryside, has a population of around 280.

References

Populated places in South Holland
Molenlanden